Dhee is a 2007 Indian Telugu-language action comedy film  directed by Srinu Vytla and produced by Siri Venkateswara Films. The film stars Vishnu Manchu and Genelia D'Souza while Srihari and Brahmanandam play supporting roles. It was released on 13 April 2007. The film was remade into Oriya as Tu Mo Girlfriend (2011), in Tamil under the title Mirattal and in Bengali as Khokababu (2012). A sequel titled D and D: Double Dose has been announced in 2020. The film won two Nandi Awards. Nani worked as an assistant director in this film before making his acting debut 2 years later in Ashta Chamma. The film was dubbed six years later in Hindi as Sabse Badi Hera Pheri.

Plot 
Srinivas "Babloo" Rao (Vishnu Manchu) is a happy-go-lucky guy who likes to have fun with his friends and always gets into trouble. Because of this, his father Narayana Rao (Chandra Mohan) gets him a job with Shankar Goud (Srihari), a local mafia head don leader. Shankar and Ballu (Supreeth), a dreaded local goon, are rivals, and Ballu is determined to kill Shankar's sister Pooja (Genelia D'Souza) to avenge his brother's (Ajay) death because he murdered the couple, and now he is killed by Shankar. Babloo falls in love with Pooja, but Shankar is planning an arranged marriage for her with Ajay (Jai Akash), an NRI doctor. Babloo and Pooja elope to get married, and Babloo later saves Pooja from Ballu. The rest of the story tells how Babloo marries Pooja and how Shankar finishes Ballu to protect his sister.

In the end, Shankar lets Ajay marry another girl, and Ajay agrees and goes back to the USA. When Shankar finds out that Babloo and Pooja are falling in love with each other, Shankar and his henchmen badly beat Babloo. Srirangam Sheshadri Chary (Brahmanandam), one of Shankar's employees, calls Narayana and tells him that Shankar is trying to kill Babloo. Narayana comes and tells the goons to let Babloo go. One of Shankar's henchmen, who is also his right hand (Brahmaji), cheats him. Shankar fires Babloo and tells him to never come back because he thinks that Babloo and Pooja fell in love with each other. On the way to the wedding, one of Ballu's henchmen blocks five cars of Shankar's henchmen, and now Shankar, Pooja, and Brahmaji are trapped. When Ballu and his henchmen are there, Brahmaji gives Shankar a gun to shoot him, and he does. However, the gun does not have bullets, and Shankar is shocked to see that Brahmaji has been working for Ballu all along. Ballu tricks Shankar, and according to his plan, he planned to handover Shankar & pooja. Shankar, in a fit of rage, kills almost all of Ballu's henchmen, including Brahmaji, but he is brutally injured, and Ballu finally kidnaps Pooja.

Chary knows about this and tells Babloo that Shankar is injured and Pooja is abducted by Ballu. Ballu calls Shankar on the phone and tells them that he will kill Pooja if he couldn’t find a way to rescue pooja in three hours. Shankar tells Babloo that Babloo could marry Pooja if he kills all of Ballu's henchmen, to which he agrees. Shankar and Babloo find out that Pooja is held captive in an almost abandoned building. Babloo fights Ballu's henchmen, while Shankar fights Ballu. Shankar finally defeats Ballu. The film ends with Shankar letting Pooja marry Babloo and them doing so. Pooja also gives birth to a first child.

Cast 

 Manchu Vishnu as Srinivas "Babloo" Rao
 Genelia D'Souza as Pooja Goud (Voice dubbed by Savitha Reddy)
 Srihari as Shankar Goud
 Bramhanandam as Srirangam Sheshadri Chary
 Chandra Mohan as Narayana Rao, Babloo's father
 Akash as Ajay
 Supreeth as Ballu
 Ajay as Ballu's brother
 Sunil as Katthi
 Santhoshi as Kumari
 Delhi Rajeswari as Babloo's mother
 Chatrapathi Sekhar as Shankar Goud's Henchman
 Suma Kanakala as Shankar Goud's Henchman's Wife 
 Brahmaji as Shankar Gowd's right hand who is revealed to be Ballu's henchmen
 Tanikella Bharani as Corporator Krishna
 Jaya Prakash Reddy as Pedhanarayana, Shankar and Pooja's uncle
 Prema as Shankar Gowd's wife
 Shafi as Professional Killer
 Srinivasa Reddy as Babloo's friend
 Bharath Raju as Ballu's henchmen
 Master Bharath as Mani Ratnam
 Chitram Seenu

Sequel 
Director Vaitla announced the sequel of the film with Vishnu reprising his character in November 2020. The film is titled as D and D: Double Dose.

Awards
Nandi Awards - 2007
Best Screenplay Writer - Sreenu Vaitla 
Best Fight Master - Ram-Lakshman

References

External links 
 

2007 films
Telugu films remade in other languages
Films directed by Srinu Vaitla
2000s Telugu-language films
Films scored by Chakri